RT-MART International Ltd., trading as RT-Mart, is a hypermarket chain in Taiwan. Its headquarters is in Zhongshan District, Taipei. The company opened its 23rd store in 2004. RT-Mart and Auchan created a joint venture, Sun Art Retail Group Ltd.

PX Mart acquired equity interests in RT-Mart's distribution business held by Auchan Group and Ruentex Group, will include its own land and buildings, store operation rights and its own brands.

References

External links

 RT-Mart 

Companies based in Taipei
Retail companies of Taiwan
Supermarkets of Taiwan
Taiwanese companies established in 1996
Retail companies established in 1996